Wind-Rain Song is an outdoor 1982 bronze sculpture by Weltzin Blix, installed at the Hult Center for the Performing Arts in Eugene, Oregon, in the United States.

Description

Weltzin Blix's Wind-Rain Song (1982) is installed outside the Hult Center for the Performing Arts. Previously, the abstract work was installed inside the Conference Center adjacent to Hult and the Hilton Hotel. It was moved to its current site, a pedestrian plaza, seven years later. According to the Smithsonian Institution, "The artist was very pleased, and constructed a piece to add to the bottom of shaft, making the sculpture the size that he had initially envisioned when he designed it." It measures approximately  x ,  x , . A nearby plaque reads: . The sculpture was surveyed and deemed "treatment needed" by Smithsonian's "Save Outdoor Sculpture!" program in October 1993.

See also

 1982 in art

References

1982 establishments in Oregon
1982 sculptures
Abstract sculptures in Oregon
Bronze sculptures in Oregon
Outdoor sculptures in Eugene, Oregon